Journey's End is a Canadian documentary film, directed by Jean-François Caissy and released in 2018. The film profiles the residents of the Auberge des Caps, a former motel in Carleton, Quebec which has been converted into a retirement home.

The film was a Genie Award nominee for Best Feature Length Documentary at the 31st Genie Awards, and a Jutra Award nominee for Best Documentary at the 13th Jutra Awards.

References

External links 
 

2010 films
Canadian documentary films
Films set in Quebec
Films shot in Quebec
French-language Canadian films
2010s Canadian films